Gheorghe Ghipu (born 30 September 1954) is a Romanian middle-distance runner. He competed in the men's 800 metres at the 1972 Summer Olympics.

References

1954 births
Living people
Athletes (track and field) at the 1972 Summer Olympics
Athletes (track and field) at the 1976 Summer Olympics
Romanian male middle-distance runners
Olympic athletes of Romania
Place of birth missing (living people)
Universiade bronze medalists for Romania
Universiade medalists in athletics (track and field)
Medalists at the 1975 Summer Universiade